MZKT-74135 is a tank transporter developed by MZKT of Belarus. It has a  engine and can tow up to 130 metric tons. The MZKT-74135 can transport either two tanks or one tank and two infantry fighting vehicles. It is equipped with independent suspension all around with all wheel drive and was developed specifically for hot desert climates. 40 units were ordered by UAE.

See also 
 Oshkosh M1070
 KAMAZ-7850

References

Links 

Military vehicles of Belarus
Military trucks
Tank transporters
Artillery tractors